Bartłomiej Babiarz (born 3 February 1989) is a Polish professional footballer who plays as a central midfielder for Skra Częstochowa. Besides Poland, he has played in Greece.

Club career
On 17 August 2020, he signed a one-year contract with Wigry Suwałki.

Career statistics

Club

1 Including Ekstraklasa Cup.

References

1989 births
Sportspeople from Katowice
Living people
Polish footballers
Association football midfielders
GKS Tychy players
Ruch Chorzów players
Bruk-Bet Termalica Nieciecza players
Apollon Smyrnis F.C. players
Zagłębie Sosnowiec players
Wigry Suwałki players
Skra Częstochowa players
Ekstraklasa players
I liga players
II liga players
Super League Greece players
Polish expatriate footballers
Expatriate footballers in Greece
Polish expatriate sportspeople in Greece